The Belarusian Ecological Party (Belorusskaia ekologicheskaia partiia, BEP) was a political party in Belarus.

History
The party contested the 1995 parliamentary elections, winning one seat in the fourth round of voting. When the National Assembly was established in 1996, the party was given one seat in the House of Representatives. However, it was closed down by the Supreme Court in 1998.

References

Political parties disestablished in 1998
Defunct political parties in Belarus